John Robson (24 May 1860 – 11 January 1922) was an Englishman who was the full-time secretary manager of Middlesbrough, Crystal Palace and Brighton & Hove Albion, as well as manager of Manchester United.

Career
Robson started his managerial career with Middlesbrough, where he was paid £3 a week and declined to travel to away games as an economic measure. Despite his parsimonious attitude, he took the club from being an amateur outfit in the Northern League to a professional club in the First Division. He was also the first manager of Crystal Palace and coached the club to one of the greatest FA Cup shocks of all time when they defeated Newcastle United at St James' Park in 1907. He later managed Brighton & Hove Albion and started the concept of being a manager and not a secretary at Manchester United. He stepped down as United manager due to ill health in October 1921 and died of pneumonia on 11 January 1922.

Honours

As a manager 
Brighton & Hove Albion
Southern League Division One: 1909–10
Charity Shield: 1910

Managerial statistics

References

External links

Sportspeople from Durham, England
English football managers
Middlesbrough F.C. managers
Crystal Palace F.C. managers
Brighton & Hove Albion F.C. managers
Manchester United F.C. managers
1922 deaths
1860 births
Deaths from pneumonia in England